No. 16 Squadron ( or LLv.16, from 3 May 1942 Le.Lv.16), renamed No. 16 Reconnaissance Squadron (Finnish: Tiedustelulentolaivue 16 or TLe.Lv.16 on 14 February 1944) was a reconnaissance squadron of the Finnish Air Force during World War II. The squadron was part of Flying Regiment 1 during the Winter War and Flying Regiment 2 during the Continuation War.

Organization

Winter War
1st Flight (1. Lentue)
2nd Flight (2. Lentue)
3rd Flight (3. Lentue)

The equipment consisted of 8 Blackburn Ripon IIs, 4 Fokker C.VEs, 3 Junkers W 34 and K 43, and 3 Fokker C.Xs.

Continuation War
HQ Flight (Esikuntalentue, operational between 8 June 1942 and 1 July 1943)
1st Flight (1. Lentue)
2nd Flight (2. Lentue)
3rd Flight (3. Lentue)
Detachment Jäntti (Osasto Jäntti, temporary detachment July–August 1944)

The equipment consisted of 5 Gloster Gladiator IIs, 3 Fokker D.Xs, 4 Westland Lysander Is, 6 VL Myrsky IIs, and an undisclosed number of de Havilland Moths.

External links

Lentolaivue 16

16